Mickey's Warriors is a 1930 short film in Larry Darmour's Mickey McGuire series starring a young Mickey Rooney. Directed by Albert Herman, the two-reel short was released to theaters on May 25, 1930 by RKO.

Synopsis
Mickey's gang and Stinkey's gang are all attending a high society lawn party. Mickey's pals eventually put on a show in which they sing about bringing peace to the world. All goes well until Stinkey's Gang starts trouble.

Cast
Mickey Rooney - Mickey McGuire
Billy Barty - Billy McGuire
Jimmy Robinson - Hambone Johnson
Delia Bogard - Tomboy Taylor
Marvin Stephens - Katrink
Douglas Fox - Stinkey Davis

External links 
 

1930 films
1930 comedy films
American black-and-white films
Mickey McGuire short film series
1930 short films
American comedy short films
1930s English-language films
1930s American films